Samatu (Samadu) is a moribund Loloish language spoken by older adults in Zhenkang and Yongde counties in Yunnan, China.

References

Loloish languages